Pan Thakhin is a 1996 Burmese drama film, directed by Kyee Myint starring Lwin Moe, Htet Htet Moe Oo and Zaw Lin. The film won the Best Picture Award, Kyee Myint won the Best Director Award, Htet Htet Moe Oo won the Best Actress Award and Zaw Lin won the Best Supporting Actor Award in 1996 Myanmar Motion Picture Academy Awards.

Cast
Lwin Moe as Kaung Kyaw
Htet Htet Moe Oo as Pan Ei
Zaw Lin as Pan Aung

Awards

References

1996 films
1990s Burmese-language films
Burmese drama films
Films shot in Myanmar
1996 drama films